Parliamentary elections will be held in Finland on 2 April 2023 to members of parliament for the 2023–2027 term.

Background 
The former prime minister, Antti Rinne, resigned from his post due to a scandal regarding the Finnish postal service (Posti). Rinne's Social Democratic Party of Finland elected Sanna Marin to replace him. Marin took office on 10 December 2019.

COVID-19 effect
During the COVID-19 pandemic in Finland, the Social Democratic Party of Prime Minister Sanna Marin initially saw a sharp rise in popularity, and the Finns Party, which had been leading polls before the pandemic, saw a dip in support. However, by April 2021 the Finns Party had overtaken the Social Democrats in opinion polls and were placed first in all representative polls conducted between January and July 2021. After the National Coalition Party performed surprisingly strongly in the June 2021 municipal elections and the Finns Party performing worse than pre-election polling indicated, the latter saw another decline in their popularity, falling behind the National Coalition and the Social Democrats.

However, by late 2022 the Finns party had returned to polling at the same level as the previous elections (17%). During late 2022 the Centre Party was polling at its lowest-ever level, with less than 10% support.

Electoral system
The 200 members of the Parliament of Finland (Eduskunta) were elected using open list proportional representation in 13 multi-member constituencies, with seats allocated according to the D'Hondt method. The number of elected representatives is proportional to the population in the district six months prior to the elections. Åland has a single member electoral district and its own party system.

Contesting parties

Opinion polls

Notes

References

General elections in Finland
Finland
Parliamentary